The 2022 Pensacola 200 was an ARCA Menards Series East race that was held on March 19, 2022, at Five Flags Speedway in Pensacola, Florida. It was contested over 200 laps on the  short track. It was the second race of the 2022 ARCA Menards Series East season. Kyle Busch Motorsports driver Sammy Smith collected his second victory of the season.

Background

Entry list 

 (R) denotes rookie driver.
 (i) denotes driver who is ineligible for series driver points.

Practice

Qualifying

Starting Lineups 

Nate Moeller did qualify his No. 06 Wayne Peterson Racing Ford but drove his car renumbered with the No. 10 in the race since Benny Chastain crashed his No. 10 Toyota car of Fast Track Racing during qualifying but still made the race. Since Fast Track didn't have a backup car, Chastain withdrew from the race and let Moeller drive his (previously No. 06) car in the race.

Race

Race results

References 

Pensacola 200
Pensacola 200
2022 ARCA Menards Series East